Canarana exotica is a species of beetle in the family Cerambycidae. It was described by Galileo and Martins in 2001. It is known from Ecuador.

References

exotica
Beetles described in 2001